Muhammad Nashnoush (born June 14, 1988, in Tripoli), is a Libyan footballer who currently plays for Al-Ahli Tripoli as a goalkeeper.

Club career

Muhammad Nashnoush started his career at Al-Shat in 2010. In 2011, he signed for Al-Ittihad Tripoli. However, he did not make any appearances for the club after the 2010-11 Libyan Premier League was cancelled due to the 2011 Libyan Civil War. After the war ended and the league started, he signed for Al-Ahly Tripoli. He is now the vice-captain and the first-choice goalkeeper of the club.

International career

Muhammad Nashnoush was first called into the Libyan national football team in 2010. He made his first appearance in an 2012 Africa Cup of Nations qualification match against Comoros in June 2011, coming on as a substitute. The match ended 1-1. After qualifying for the Africa Cup of Nations, he was named in the 23-man squad to compete in the tournament. However, he was an unused substitute in the whole tournament.

In 2014, he was called into the national team for the 2014 African Nations Championship where he helped the team through three consecutive penalty shoot-outs in the knockout stage, including scoring the winning penalty in the semi-final shootout with Zimbabwe. Libya won the tournament (their first continental title) in the final match against Ghana.

References

1988 births
Living people
Libyan footballers
Libya international footballers
Al-Ittihad Club (Tripoli) players
2012 Africa Cup of Nations players
People from Tripoli, Libya
Association football goalkeepers
Al-Ahli SC (Tripoli) players
Libyan Premier League players
Libya A' international footballers
2014 African Nations Championship players
2018 African Nations Championship players